Welles Park is one of the 5 parks created by the Lincoln Park Commission and is named after Gideon Welles. It is part of the City's park system administered by the Chicago Park District. A volunteer organization, The Welles Park Advisory Council helps support the park.

Located between Western, Lincoln, Montrose, & Sunnyside Ave, it serves the Lincoln Square community of Chicago. Called one of the best neighborhood parks in the city. Welles Park has been described as 15 acres of great facilities (tennis, softball, an indoor pool, horseshoe pits) that never feels remotely crowded.

References

Parks_in_Chicago
1910 establishments in Illinois 
Urban public parks